DWBC-TV is a commercial relay television station owned by GMA Network Inc. Its studio is located at Brgy. Bayubay Sur, San Vicente, Ilocos Sur and the location of transmitter is at Mt. Caniao, Bantay, Ilocos Sur.

About DWBC-TV
2011 - GMA TV-48 Ilocos Sur began its broadcast via transmitter based at Mt. Caniao, Bantay, Ilocos Sur.
June 7, 2012 - GMA Ilocos launched as an originating station, which primarily covers the provinces of Ilocos Norte (via Channel 5), Abra (Channel 7) and Ilocos Sur (via Channel 48).
June 25, 2012 – November 7, 2014 - GMA Ilocos launched its flagship local newscast Balitang Ilokano.
November 10, 2014 – April 24, 2015 - GMA Ilocos relaunched its flagship local newscast 24 Oras Ilokano.
October 3, 2016 - GMA Ilocos began to simulcast GMA Dagupan's Balitang Amianan.
February 5, 2021 - GMA Ilocos started digital test broadcasts on UHF 15 covering Vigan and the provinces of Ilocos Sur and Ilocos Norte.
April 13, 2022 - GMA Ilocos inaugurates its state-of-the-art facilities and studios located at Brgy. Bayubay Sur, San Vicente, Ilocos Sur.
2022 - GMA Ilocos begins to split into two: GMA Ilocos Sur and GMA Ilocos Norte.

Currently aired program
One North Central Luzon - flagship afternoon newscast (simulcast on TV-10 Dagupan)
Mornings with GMA Regional TV - flagship morning newscast (simulcast on TV-10 Dagupan)

Previously aired programs
Balitang Ilokano 
24 Oras Ilokano - defunct regional newscast, cancelled due to streamlining of regional operations

Digital television

Digital channels
UHF Channel 15 (479.143 MHz)

Area of coverage

Primary areas 
 Vigan
 Ilocos Sur 
 Abra

Secondary areas  
 Portion of Ilocos Norte

See also
List of GMA Network stations

References

Digital television stations in the Philippines
Television stations in the Philippines
Television stations in Ilocos Sur
Television channels and stations established in 2011
GMA Network stations